AECL is an acronym that can stand for:
Advanced Electronics Company Limited
Atomic Energy of Canada Limited
Australian Eggs